Khasa Prakrit (also known  as Khas Prakrit, Sanskrit Khasa, Himalayan Prakrit, Northern Prakrit, Khas Kura) is a hypothesized Prakrit language of medieval India and Nepal. It is considered to be an ancestor of Pahari languages, which includes Nepali, Kumaoni, and Garhwali languages. Khasa Prakrit's dialects includes Doteli and Jumli language.

Indian linguist Suniti Kumar Chatterji suggests that Nepali language developed from Khasa Prakrit, however, some linguist disagree with Chatterji. Khas Prakrit is named after the speakers of language, Khas people, who live in the Himalayas.

Language comparison

See also 

 Apabhraṃśa
 Prakrit
 Nepali language

References

Prakrit languages